The 1915 Baltimore mayoral election saw the reelection of James H. Preston.

General election
The general election was held May 4.

Other candidates included Socialist nominee C. F. Saunders and Labor nominee Robert W. Stevens.

References

Baltimore mayoral
1915
Baltimore